Knatten is a small village near Sveg, Sweden, which is in Härjedalen province.  The name translates to foothills in English.  It consists of a few dozen log cabins in a clearing in the forest set in the foothills of Knattenberget.

Populated places in Jämtland County